Mythimna is a former municipality in the Chania regional unit, Crete, Greece. Since the 2011 local government reform it is part of the municipality Kissamos, of which it is a municipal unit. It was part of the former Kissamos province which covered the north west of Chania Prefecture.

The municipal unit of Mythimna extends from the north coast to the foothills of the White Mountains (Lefka Ori). The seat of the municipality was Drapanias.

See also
List of communities of Chania

References

External links
Municipality description
GTP description

Populated places in Chania (regional unit)
Insect pests of millets